Mnesarchella ngahuru is a species of primitive moth in the family Mnesarchaeidae. This species is endemic to New Zealand and is found in the Taupō, Gisborne and Wellington regions.

Taxonomy 

This species was first described by George William Gibbs in 2019. The male holotype specimen was collected by Gibbs on the Manuoha track in Te Urewera and is held in the New Zealand Arthropod Collection.

Description 
This species is very similar in appearance to its close relatives such as M. acuta, M. falcata and M. hamadelpha but can be distinguished by the shape of the male genitalia. Gibbs describes the colour of the male forewings as follows:
Although occurring in the same range as M. loxoscia and M. falcata, adults of M. ngahuru are normally on the wing at a later time.

Distribution 
This species is endemic to New Zealand. It is found in the Taupō, Gisborne and Wellington regions.

Habitat 
This species lives in damp but well lit forests at altitudes of between 350 to 1100 m.

Behaviour 
The adults of this species appear later in the season in comparison to its close relatives being on the wing from December to March.

References

Moths described in 2019
Endemic fauna of New Zealand
Moths of New Zealand
Mnesarchaeoidea
Taxa named by George William Gibbs
Endemic moths of New Zealand